Sellick is a surname. Notable people with the surname include:

Arthur Sellick (1878–1958), English cricketer
Brian Arthur Sellick (1918–1996), British anesthesiologist
Phyllis Sellick (1911–2007), English classical pianist and educator
Robin Sellick (born 1967), Australian photographer